Bramley-Moore is a double-barrelled surname.

List of people with the surname 

 Alwyn Bramley-Moore (1878–1916), Canadian politician from Alberta
 John Bramley-Moore (1800–1886), English politician

See also 

 Bramley-Moore Dock
 Everton Stadium, also knows as Bramley-Moore Dock Stadium
 Bramley (surname)
 Moore (surname)

Surnames
Compound surnames
English-language surnames
Surnames of British Isles origin